Fossil Fools Day is an environmental demonstration day.  It occurs on April 1.  The name is a play on the term fossil fuels and April Fools' Day.

Fossil Fools Day began in 2004 with coordinated actions across the United States and Canada. Subsequent Fossil Fools Days have been held in many cities around the world, and are generally organized by one or more environmental organizations with funding from Energy Action Coalition and Rising Tide. These events oppose energy derived from fossil fuels, promote education about alternative sources of energy, and encourage support for climate justice, strong legislation, corporate responsibility and a clean renewable energy future.

See also 
 Conservation movement
 Earth Day
 Ecology
 Energy Action Coalition
 Environmentalism
 Environmental protection
 Natural environment
 Natural resource
 Renewable resource
 Sustainability

References

External links
Fossil Fools Day on Energy Action Coalition.org

Environmental awareness days
April observances
April Fools' Day